Elite Hotel is the third studio album by American country music artist Emmylou Harris, released in 1975. Elite Hotel was Harris' second album to be released in 1975, preceded by the widely acclaimed Pieces of the Sky. Elite Hotel surpassed it on the Billboard charts, becoming Harris' first #1 country album. The album yielded two #1 country singles: "Together Again" and Harris' version of the Patsy Cline hit "Sweet Dreams", and "One of These Days" made it to the #3 spot. A performance of the Beatles' "Here, There and Everywhere" entered the pop charts at #65.  Harris' eclectic musical tastes were reflected in her choice of material by Hank Williams, The Beatles, Gram Parsons and Buck Owens. Harris' vocals on the album earned her the Grammy Award for Best Country Vocal Performance, Female.

The cover photograph was taken by Tom Wilkes at 2259 Inyo Street, Mojave, California.

Track listing

Personnel

Emmylou Harris - vocals, acoustic guitar
Brian Ahern - acoustic guitar, bass
Mike Auldridge - dobro
Byron Berline - fiddle, mandolin
Dianne Brooks - backing vocals
James Burton - electric guitar
Rodney Crowell - electric guitar, backing vocals
Rick Cunha - acoustic guitar
Nick DeCaro - string arrangements
Hank DeVito - pedal steel
Jonathan Edwards - backing vocals
Amos Garrett - electric guitar
Emory Gordy Jr. - bass, backing vocals
Glen Hardin - piano, electric piano, string arrangements
Ben Keith - pedal steel
Bernie Leadon - acoustic guitar, backing vocals
Bill Payne - piano
Herb Pedersen - acoustic guitar, banjo, backing vocals
Mickey Raphael - harmonica
Linda Ronstadt - backing vocals
Fayssoux Starling - backing vocals
John Starling - acoustic guitar, backing vocals
Ron Tutt - drums
John Ware - drums

Technical
Brian Ahern - Producer, Engineer
Bradley Hartman - Engineer
Rudy Hill - Engineer
Stuart Taylor - Engineer
Miles Wilkinson - Engineer

Charts

Weekly charts

Year-end charts

References

 Emmylou Harris Elite Hotel liner notes

Emmylou Harris albums
1975 albums
Albums produced by Brian Ahern (producer)
Reprise Records albums